Olga Smirnova is a Russian physicist who is Head of the Strong Field Theory Group at the Max Born Institute for Nonlinear Optics and Short Pulse Spectroscopy and Professor at the Technical University of Berlin. Her research considers the interaction of strong fields with atoms and molecules.

Early life and education 
Smirnova was born in Moscow. She started her undergraduate career studying physics at the Moscow State University. After earning her doctorate in 2000, Smirnova became an assistant professor at the Moscow State University, and interested in attosecond physics. In 2003 she moved to the Technical University of Vienna (TU Wien) as a Lise Meitner Fellow. After two years in Vienna, Smirnova joined the theoretical group at the National Research Council Canada in the Steacie Institute for Molecular Science. In 2006 she was made a permanent member of staff at the Steacie Institute.

Research and career 
In 2009, Smirnova moved to the Max Born Institute for Nonlinear Optics and Short Pulse Spectroscopy, Berlin, where she launched her own research group studying ultrafast photonics. In particular, Smrinova is interested in imaging the structures and dynamics of molecular assemblies. The movement of electrons that occurs during chemical reactions happens at the attosecond time-scale. The ultrafast measurements performed by Smirnovoa make use of strong infrared fields to liberate electrons from molecules. Smrinova then images the motion of these electrons via their recollsion. Recollision describes the movement of these oscillating, liberated electrons back to their parent ions, resulting in elastic and inelastic scattering (i.e. diffraction imaging) as well as radiative recombination (i.e. the emission of XUV light). Smirnova was promoted to full Professor at Technical University of Berlin in 2016.

Smirnova has developed new approaches to differentiate between left- and right-handed molecular enantiomers. Smirnova induces chiral dynamics in the molecular systems and probes them using a chiral experimental set-up. She introduces locally chiral electronic fields that can be tuned to excite enantiomers of a specific handedness. Synthetic chiral light can be manipulated to allow control of the intensity, polarisation and propagation of the optical response on randomly arranged chiral molecules.

Awards and honours 
 2022 ERC Advanced Grant
 2019 American Chemical Society Ahmed Zewail Award in Ultrafast Science & Technology
 2010 Deutsche Physikalische Gesellschaft Karl-Scheel-Preis
 2009 Leibniz Competition Award SAW award

Selected publications

References

External links
 
 

Russian women physicists
20th-century Russian physicists
21st-century Russian physicists
20th-century Russian women scientists
21st-century Russian women scientists
Academic staff of the Technical University of Berlin
European Research Council grantees
Moscow State University alumni
1973 births
Living people